2XS is the thirteenth studio album by the Scottish hard rock band Nazareth, released internationally in 1982 by Vertigo Records, whereas its distribution was handled by NEMS International in the United Kingdom and by A&M Records in North America. Recorded and mixed at AIR Studios on the island of Montserrat, the album was produced and engineered by John Punter.

2XS peaked at number 122 in the United States during a ten-week chart stay, marking the last time Nazareth managed to reach the Billboard 200. Three singles were released from the album. The lead single, "Love Leads to Madness", reached number 3 in South Africa and the song itself was a US radio staple peaking at number 19 on the Billboard Mainstream Rock chart. While the second single, "Games", failed to chart elsewhere, the third one, "Dream On", was a European hit, reaching number 2 in Switzerland, number 4 in Austria and number 15 in Germany.

Track listing

Personnel

Nazareth
 Dan McCafferty – vocals
 Manny Charlton – lead guitar
 Billy Rankin – lead guitar, backing vocals
 John Locke – keyboards
 Pete Agnew – bass guitar, backing vocals
 Darrell Sweet – drums, percussion, backing vocals

Technical personnel
 John Punter – producer
 Mick Haggerty – art direction, design
 Jeffrey Kent Ayeroff – art direction
 Timothy Eames – design
 Aaron Rapoport – photography
 Hugh Brown – photography (inner sleeve)
 Frank Deluna – mastering (at A&M Mastering Studios, Los Angeles)

Chart performance

References

Nazareth (band) albums
1982 albums
Albums produced by John Punter
Vertigo Records albums
A&M Records albums
Albums recorded at AIR Studios